Choral railway station is a small railway station in Indore district, Madhya Pradesh. Its code is CRL. It serves Choral town. The station consists of one platform. The platform is not well sheltered. It lacks many facilities including water and sanitation. Recently gauge conversion started on this line. After conversion it will connect Indore to South India.

Connectivity
The station is connected with Dr. Ambedkar Nagar Railway Station (MHOW) to the north west and Sanawad to the south-east on the Dr. Ambedkar Nagar (MHOW) - Sanawad Meter Gauge Railline.

The station is well-connected to Indore Jn. via Dr. Ambedkar Nagar, MHOW.

Electrification
At present, the station is on non-electrified rail route.

Developments
The conversion of Dr. Ambedkar Nagar Railway Station (MHOW) to Sanawad (meter-gauge) to (broad-gauge) rail line is in progress. Upon completion, It would directly connect Indore to Mumbai.

References 

Ratlam railway division
Railway stations in Indore district